Springvale South is a suburb in Melbourne, Victoria, Australia, 24 km south-east of Melbourne's Central Business District, located within the City of Greater Dandenong local government area. Springvale South recorded a population of 12,766 at the 2021 census.

History

Springvale South Post Office opened on 4 November 1926.

Population and Social Conditions

The residents of this suburb have lower levels of migrant settlement, incomes and early school leaving than Greater Dandenong and a high proportion of Buddhist residents.

It found that 59% of residents were born overseas, similar to Greater Dandenong (60%) and substantially more than the metropolitan level of 33%. Among the 88 birthplaces of its residents were Vietnam (18%), Cambodia (12%), India (4%) and China (2%). Rates of migrant settlement are relatively low, with 4% of residents having arrived in Australia within the previous 2.5 years – little more than half the corresponding figure for Greater Dandenong, of 7%.

Languages other than English are spoken by 71% of residents – compared with 64% for Greater Dandenong. Twenty per cent of Springvale South residents have limited fluency in the use of spoken English, more than the municipal level of 14% and five times the metropolitan level, of 4%. Among the major religious faiths are Buddhism, adhered to by 38% of residents, Islam (3%) and Hinduism (2%).

Nine per cent of young adults (20–24 years) had left school before completing year 11 – lower than either the municipal average of 13% and the metropolitan level, of 10% Median individual gross incomes of $376 p.w., recorded in the Census, are among lowest in Greater Dandenong and about two-thirds (64%) of metropolitan levels.

Education

There are three public primary schools in Springvale South:
 Springvale South Primary School
 Spring Parks Primary School
 Heatherhill Primary School

The two secondary schools, Heatherhill Secondary College and Coomoora Secondary College, have been merged with Springvale Secondary College and Chandler Secondary College into Keysborough Secondary College.

Religious buildings

Springvale Road south of the Springvale commercial area has a concentration of religious buildings of different faiths:
 The Church of Jesus Christ of Latter-day Saints Braeside Stake Centre
 Spanish Seventh Day Adventist
 Bright Moon Buddhist Society
 Cambodian Buddhist Temple
 New Apostolic Church
 Khmer Buddhist Centre
 Vietnamese Buddhist centre

Sport

Heatherton United play soccer and compete in the Victorian State League Division 2

Transport

There are four buses operated by Grenda's Bus Services that service the Springvale South vicinity.

See also
 City of Springvale – Springvale South was previously within this former local government area.

References

Suburbs of Melbourne
Suburbs of the City of Greater Dandenong